Purdiaea is a genus of flowering plants in the family Clethraceae described as a genus in 1846. It is one of two genera in this family, and was formerly classified in the related family Cyrillaceae. Purdiaea is native to tropical regions of the Caribbean (with the highest species diversity on Cuba), Central America and northern South America, further south than the related genus Clethra, the only other genus of this family.

The genus is composed of shrubs and small trees with alternating leaves.

Selected species
 Purdiaea belizensis (A.C.Sm. & Standl.) J.L.Thomas – "Belize purdiaea," Central America. 
 Purdiaea cubensis (A.Rich.) Urb. – "Cuban purdiaea," "Clavellina," SE USA, Cuba. 
 Purdiaea ekmanii Vict. – Cuba
 Purdiaea microphylla Britton & P.Wilson – Cuba
 Purdiaea nipensis Vict. & León – Cuba
 Purdiaea nutans G.Planch. – Venezuela, Ecuador, Peru
 Purdiaea ophiticola Vict. – Cuba
 Purdiaea shaferi Britton – Cuba
 Purdiaea stenopetala Griseb. – Cuba
 Purdiaea tereosepala J.L.Thomas – Cuba
 Purdiaea velutina Britton & P.Wilson – Cuba

References

External links
Anderberg, A. A. & Zhang, Z. (2002). Phylogenetic relationships of Cyrillaceae and Clethraceae (Ericales) with special emphasis on the genus Purdiaea. Organisms, Div. & Evol''. 2: 127–137 abstract.
  Notes on the genus Purdiaea
New York Botanical Gardens: Purdiaea herbarium specimens list
Photos of P. cubensis
 Photo of P. nutans

Ericales
Ericales genera